Resan till dej is a 1953 Swedish comedy film directed by Stig Olin.

Plot summary
The young and happy couple Emil and Gun have been married for five years but are still saving money for their honeymoon. 
One day Gun happens to sing on a radio show, successfully and signs a contract with a gramophone company, fame and fortune is soon hers. But the marriage is strained by her career and her touring when Emil feels alone and abandoned at home.

Cast
Alice Babs as Gunborg "Gun" Karlsson
Sven Lindberg as Emil "Mille" Larsson/speaker
Anders Henrikson as Vilhelm "Ville" Karlsson
Hjördis Petterson as Dagmar Vikström 
Nils Hallberg as Berra Gustavsson 
Karl-Arne Holmsten as Staffan Bendix
Stig Järrel as Bruno Vikström
Douglas Håge as Lundberg
Ulla Sjöblom as Maudan
Sigge Fürst as himself, show host for "Familjelördag" 
Dagmar Olsson as Mrs. Bertils, journalist at "Hemmet och vi" 
Rune Halvarsson as Lyrics Writer 
Jussi Björling as himself, guest at "Familjelördag"

External links

1953 films
1950s Swedish-language films
Films directed by Stig Olin
Swedish comedy films
1953 comedy films
1950s Swedish films